Saint Vouga (or Vougar, Vaughe, Vauge, Vorech, Vie; died 585) was an Irish priest who moved to Brittany, now in France. He attempted to live as a hermit, but could not avoid people who came to him for cures, drawn by his reputation.

Monks of Ramsgate account

The monks of St Augustine's Abbey, Ramsgate wrote in their Book of Saints (1921),

Baring-Gould's account

Sabine Baring-Gould (1834–1924) in his Lives Of The Saints wrote,

Butler's account

The hagiographer Alban Butler (1710–1773) wrote in his Lives of the Fathers, Martyrs, and Other Principal Saints under May 28,

O'Hanlon's account

John O'Hanlon (1821–1905) wrote of "Vouga, Vie or Vauk, Bishop in Brittany, France" in his Lives of the Irish Saints. He opens with a disclaimer: "Of a very unsatisfactory character is the information we are permitted to communicate regarding the present ascetic man, the greater part of whose life and actions appears to have been concealed from men and known only to the Almighty."
After discussing the sources, Hanlon continues,

O'Hanlon goes on to describe the fate of the saint's relics, which had miraculous properties, veneration at a chapel in Treguenec near Penmark, and other churches.
A church and well are dedicated to Saint Vauk or Vaak in St. Vogue's townland, Carn parish in County Wexford.
Possibly St. Vauk is the same as St. Vouga.
The ruined church of St Vauk does not appear to be very ancient.

Notes

Citations

Sources

 
 
 
 

Medieval Irish saints on the Continent
585 deaths